Pelar Dam is a proposed dam located across Nal River in Awaran District of Balochistan, Pakistan.

Due to financial constraints, funding for the project was stopped in 2011.

See also
List of dams and reservoirs in Pakistan

Notes

Dams in Balochistan, Pakistan
Hydroelectric power stations in Pakistan